Atkan Chatkan is a 2020 Indian Hindi-language musical drama film written and directed by Shiv Hare on his directorial debut. It is produced by Vishakha Singh under Lokaa Entertainment and presented by music composer AR Rahman. The film story revolves around Guddu, a chai delivery boy who eventually teams up with three friends and forms a musical band to take part in a musical competition despite the poor background. The film stars newcomer Lydian Nadhaswaram along with Amitriyaan , Yash Rane, Sachin Chaudhary, Tamanna Dipak and Ayesha Vindhara in the lead roles. The film was premiered via ZEE5 on 5 September 2020 and generally opened to positive reviews from critics.

Plot
The story revolves around a 13 year old Guddu who works as a helper at a tea stall. His father, an ex musician is a penniless alcoholic, and his mother a singer has abandoned the family. Therefore, he has to take the responsibility of his family at a tender age. Music is his passion, he loves to observe, listen and create new tunes. On his daily chai delivery visits, he watches a wedding band practice keenly, completely losing the sense of time. He has a desire to join the band one day. Along with Guddu, the film also tells the tale of other street children who work near Guddu’s tea stall. One day while wandering in the city, they come across a carnival where they see an orchestra performing for money which inspires them to form their own band. Atkan Chatkan shows the dreams of millions of young children who do not have the means but only a burning passion that needs careful nurturing to grow and succeed in life.

Cast
 Lydian Nadhaswaram as Guddu
 Amitriyaan as Guddu's Father
 Spruha Joshi as Guddu's Mother
 Yash Rane as Madhav
 Sachin Chaudhary as Chuttan
 Tamanna Dipak as Meethi
 Ayesha Vindhara as Lata
Saurabh V Pandey
 Tanmay Chaturvedi as BullyBoy

Production 
The son of music director Varshan Sathish, Lydian Nadhaswaram who rose to prominence as a child prodigy pianist after winning the reality talent show The World's Best was roped into play the main lead in the film. He eventually made his film acting debut through this project. Lydian whose mother tongue was Tamil began shooting for the film despite his inability to speak Hindi fluently. The film was shot predominantly in Jhansi which also coincidentally depicts the name of his mother.

Soundtrack

Reception
Atkan Chatkan upon release received mixed responses from the critics.

Renuka Vyavahare of Times Of India said "In terms of direction and storytelling, Atkan Chatkan is predictable, formulaic and opts for an over-simplistic approach of expression. What makes this film stand out despite its poverty template are the powerful performances of the child actors and Sivamani’s spectacular music"  Pradeep Kumar of The Hindu wrote "Lydian Nadhaswaram makes a solid debut and ‘Drums’ Sivamani’s soul-lifting tunes are worth checking out, but ‘Atkan Chatkan’ falls flat due to the lack of drama in its storyline"  Ektaa malik of The Indian Express wrote "The two-hour-fifteen minute film is the directorial debut of Shiv Hare, and while the earnestness of the attempt was palpable in the trailer, the full-length feature adds nothing more to it"  Vibha Maru of India Today had just few positives to mention about the film stating "The film's only highlight is when we see Lydian beat the tunes of Sivamani's music, pouring some excitement into the film. Other child actors like Sachin Choudhary and Yash Rane also give notable performances"

References

External links
 
 Atkan Chatkan on ZEE5

2020s Hindi-language films
2020 films
ZEE5 original films
2020s musical drama films
Indian musical drama films
2020 direct-to-video films
2020 directorial debut films
Films shot in Uttar Pradesh